Woodland is a city in Talbot County, Georgia, United States. The population was 408 at the 2010 census.

History
The community was named after C.S. Woods, original owner of the town site. The Georgia General Assembly incorporated Woodland as a town in 1908.

Geography

Woodland is located at  (32.787594, -84.561018).

Demographics

As of the census of 2000, there were 432 people, 181 households, and 131 families residing in the city. The racial makeup of the city was 20.83% White, 77.78% African American, 0.23% Native American, 0.46% from other races, and 0.69% from two or more races. Hispanic or Latino of any race were 0.23% of the population.

There were 181 households, out of which 22.7% had children under the age of 18 living with them, 38.7% were married couples living together, 28.7% had a female householder with no husband present, and 27.1% were non-families. 25.4% of all households were made up of individuals, and 11.0% had someone living alone who was 65 years of age or older.  The average household size was 2.39 and the average family size was 2.81.

In the city, the population was spread out, with 20.6% under the age of 18, 8.3% from 18 to 24, 27.8% from 25 to 44, 25.9% from 45 to 64, and 17.4% who were 65 years of age or older.  The median age was 41 years. For every 100 females, there were 78.5 males.  For every 100 females age 18 and over, there were 75.9 males.

The median income for a household in the city was $17,105, and the median income for a family was $19,792. Males had a median income of $24,107 versus $15,156 for females. The per capita income for the city was $10,466.  About 32.6% of families and 34.7% of the population were below the poverty line, including 58.1% of those under age 18 and 20.5% of those age 65 or over.

https://vanishingnorthgeorgia.com/2017/01/11/the-elms-circa-1840-talbot-county/

Gallery

References

Cities in Georgia (U.S. state)
Cities in Talbot County, Georgia